The Holcomb Rock Dam is a concrete dam across the James River near Lynchburg, Virginia. The project consists of a concrete dam across the river, an earthen embankment canal on the right bank, and a power house where water is discharged to generate electricity. Per the 2008 annual generation report, the project generated 6,089,209 KW-hours.

The dam is located downstream of the larger Coleman Falls Dam.

References

Dams on the James River
Gravity dams
Dams completed in 1850
1850 establishments in Virginia
Hydroelectric power plants in Virginia